Busan FC was a South Korean football club based in the Busan. The club was a member of the K3 League Basic, an semi-professional league football in South Korea, from the 2017 season to 2018 season.

Players

Source:

Honours

Season by season records

References

See also
 List of football clubs in South Korea

K3 League (2007–2019) clubs
Sport in Busan
Busan
Association football clubs established in 2017
2017 establishments in South Korea